Castracane may refer to:
 Alessandro Castracani (or Alessandro Castracane, 1580–1649), a Roman Catholic prelate who served as Bishop of Fano
 Castruccio Castracane degli Antelminelli (1779–1852), an Italian cardinal
 Francesco Castracane degli Antelminelli (1817-1899), an Italian naturalist